Oued Endja وادي النجاء is a commune in Mila Province, Algeria. Redjas town is the capital. At the 2008 census it had a population of 19739.

There are 7 named mountains in Oued Endja District, with Koudiat Zouacha the highest point. The most prominent mountain is Djebel Essatour.

References

Communes of Mila Province
Cities in Algeria